Daniel Edward Hydrick Sr. (August 6, 1860 – January 15, 1921) was an associate justice of the South Carolina Supreme Court. He was born in Orangeburg, South Carolina on August 6, 1860, and attended Wofford College before transferring to Vanderbilt University in 1880. He began practicing law in Spartanburg, South Carolina and was twice elected to the South Carolina House of Representatives and then twice to the South Carolina Senate. He resigned during his second term in the South Carolina Senate to become a state trial court judge. His term began on December 15, 1905. He was a trial judge until 1909 when he was elected to a seat on the South Carolina Supreme Court. He was elected by the General Assembly to take the position left vacant when Ira B. Jones was elevated to the chief justice position, and he was commissioned on April 15, 1909. He was reelected to a full term in 1918. He died on January 15, 1921, in Washington, D.C.; he had been travelling from Baltimore, Maryland to Spartanburg, South Carolina to visit his son for Christmas and contracted pneumonia during the trip. He is buried in Oakwood Cemetery in Spartanburg, South Carolina.

References

Justices of the South Carolina Supreme Court
1860 births
1921 deaths
People from Orangeburg, South Carolina
Vanderbilt University alumni
Members of the South Carolina House of Representatives
South Carolina state senators
Deaths from pneumonia in Washington, D.C.